National security of the United States is a collective term encompassing the policies of both U.S. national defense and foreign relations.

Elements of U.S. national security policy 
Measures taken to ensure U.S. national security include:
 Using diplomacy to rally allies and isolate threats.
 Marshaling economic power to elicit cooperation.
 Maintaining effective armed forces.
 Implementing civil defense and emergency preparedness policies (including anti-terrorism legislation)
 Ensuring the resilience and redundancy of critical infrastructure.
 Using intelligence services to detect and defeat or avoid threats and espionage, and to protect classified information.
 Tasking counterintelligence services or secret police to protect the nation from internal threats.

U.S. national security and the Constitution 
The phrase “national security” entered U.S. political discourse as early as the Constitutional Convention. The Federalists argued that civilian control of the military required a strong central government under a single constitution.  Alexander Hamilton wrote: “If a well-regulated militia be the most natural defense of a free country, it ought certainly to be under the regulation and at the disposal of that body which is constituted the guardian of the national security.”

Organization of U.S. national security 

U.S. National Security organization has remained essentially stable since July 26, 1947, when U.S. President Harry S. Truman signed the National Security Act of 1947. Together with its 1949 amendment, this act:

 Created the National Military Establishment (NME) which became known as the Department of Defense when the act was amended in 1949.
 Formed a separate Department of the Air Force from the existing United States Army Air Forces.
 Subordinated the military branches to the new Secretary of Defense.
 Established the National Security Council to coordinate national security policy in the Executive Branch.
 Chartered the Central Intelligence Agency.

National security and civil liberties

After 9/11, the passage of the USA Patriot Act provoked debate about the alleged restriction of individual rights and freedoms for the sake of U.S. national security.  The easing of warrant requirements for intelligence surveillance, under Title II of the Act, spurred the NSA warrantless surveillance controversy. In August 2008, the United States Foreign Intelligence Surveillance Court of Review (FISCR) affirmed the constitutionality of warrantless national security surveillance.

National security reports
In May 2015, the White House released the report The National Security Implications of a Changing Climate.

See also
National security#United States
Anti-terrorism legislation
Computer insecurity
Homeland security
Nuclear deterrence
Terrorism in the United States

References

 
Political terminology of the United States
Federal government of the United States
United States
Security in the United States